Raccoon Creek may refer to:

Raccoon Creek, a tributary of the Coosa River in Alabama
Raccoon Creek (Chattooga River tributary), a stream in Georgia
Raccoon Creek (Etowah River tributary), a stream in Georgia
Raccoon Creek, a tributary of the Elm River (Illinois)
Raccoon Creek, a tributary of the Kaskaskia River near Walnut Hill, Illinois
Raccoon Creek, a creek in Maquoketa Caves State Park, Iowa
Raccoon Creek, a creek along Corridor G in Kentucky
Raccoon Creek (Missouri), a stream in Missouri
Raccoon Creek (New Jersey), a tributary of the Delaware River
Raccoon Creek, a creek near Waynesville, North Carolina; see William Holland Thomas
Raccoon Creek (Ohio), a tributary of the Ohio River near Carbondale in southern Ohio
Raccoon Creek Ecological Management Area, located in Zaleski State Forest in southern Ohio
Raccoon Creek (Beaver County, Pennsylvania), a stream in Beaver County
Raccoon Creek (Erie County, Pennsylvania), a creek in Erie County
Raccoon Creek State Park, Pennsylvania
Raccoon Creek (Tomhicken Creek), in Luzerne and Schuylkill Counties, Pennsylvania

See also
 Coon Creek (disambiguation)